The Iowa State Cyclones women's golf team represents Iowa State University (ISU) and competes in the Big 12 Conference of NCAA Division I. The team is coached by Christie Martens, she is in her 17th year at Iowa State.  The Cyclones play their home meets at Veenker Memorial Golf Course on Iowa State's campus.

History

The Iowa State women's golf team first got it start in 1972, initially competing in the Association for Intercollegiate Athletics for Women (AIAW).  Off the heels of their hot start the Cyclones appeared in three AIAW Championships in their first 12 years of existence, finishing top 25 each time.  During these early year individual success was highlighted by Barb Thomas, the high point of her career at ISU was becoming the first and only women's golf All-American in program history.  Thomas would go on to have an 18-year career on the LPGA Tour.

After almost a decade of struggles Iowa State again flourished under coach Julie Manning.  They reached the NCAA Regional four straight years from 1993-1996 in addition to their first and only Big Eight conference championship in 1993.  Two individual successes during this time period were Beth Bader and Shelly Finnestad.  Bader still holds the record for most top-10 and top-five finishes as a Cyclone with 24 and 12 respectively.  She would finish second in the 1993 Big Eight conference championship to Shelly Finnestad before going on to having a 13-year LPGA Tour career.  Finnestad's 1993 conference title remains the only Cyclone championship to date.

After another lull in success coach Christie Martens has taken the Cyclones to new heights.  In her 17th year at Iowa State she is currently on a streak of seven straight NCAA regional appearances, including finishing 23rd overall at the 2014 NCAA National Championship.  Some of the individual successes under her leadership include Punpaka Phuntumabamrung finishing as runner-up at the 2013 Big 12 Tournament and Chonlada Chayanun tying for seventh overall at the 2014 NCAA tournament.

In 2022, Ruby Chou became the first Iowa State player to individually qualify for the championship with an Iowa State Regional record of 211. She was soon joined by her teammate, Taglao Jeeravivitaporn, who defeated Northwestern's Jieni Li in a playoff for the second spot.

Record

All-conference selections

Veenker Memorial Golf Course

Named for George F. Veenker, head football coach at Iowa State from 1931 to 1936.  He was also Athletic Director from 1933 until 1945.  The golf course was completed in 1938 and given its current name in 1959.

The 6,543-yard, par-72, George Veenker Memorial Golf Course is located just two blocks north of the Iowa State campus.  The 18-hole course was constructed in 1938 from the design of world-renowned golf course architect, Perry Maxwell (re-designer of the seventh and 10th holes at Augusta National Golf Club in 1937).  The golf course was built with WPA and Athletic Council funds, and cost $122,373. The course hosted the conference championships in 1982 and 1989, two regional AIAW championships, and hosts the annual Iowa Masters Championship.  It also hosted the 1949 NCAA national championship, in which Arnold Palmer was a participant.

The team practices at the newly opened $2 million Golf Performance Center located three miles from campus.  The 16-acre facility was designed by world renowned architech Keith Foster to be used exclusively by the Iowa State men's and women's golf team.

References

External links
 Veenker Memorial Golf Course